Aureibaculum flavum is a Gram-negative, aerobic, rod-shaped and non-motile bacterium from the genus of Aureibaculum.

References 

Flavobacteria
Bacteria described in 2022